The Johnstown Chiefs were a minor league ice hockey team located in Johnstown, Pennsylvania, that played in the ECHL.  The team was founded in 1987 in the All-American Hockey League, and moved to the East Coast Hockey League (now "ECHL") when that league was formed. The Chiefs lasted for 22 years in Johnstown, and was the last of the founding ECHL teams playing under its original name and in its original city.  The Chiefs relocated to Greenville, South Carolina, following the completion of the 2010 season.

Franchise history
The owners originally wanted to name the team the Jets in honor of a team that had played in Johnstown from 1950 to 1977, mostly in the Eastern Hockey League.  However, the old Jets' former owners still held the trademark for the name and refused to allow the new team to use it. A contest was held by the owners, allowing the people of Johnstown to vote for the new team name. The cult hockey movie Slap Shot had been filmed in Johnstown, and featured a minor league team called the Charlestown Chiefs.  The fans readily jumped on the tie-in, and the Johnstown Chiefs were born.

The Chiefs played their home games in the historic 3,745 seat Cambria County War Memorial Arena in Johnstown, where most of the hockey scenes in the movie Slap Shot were filmed.  Despite popular belief, the Chiefs uniforms colors (black, gold, and white) were not chosen because of the local fans' connection to the Steelers, Pirates, and Penguins. Shortly after the emergency lease had been approved by the Cambria County War Memorial, head coach Joe Selenski traveled to Canada to find the team uniforms and called War Memorial Marketing Director Dennis Grenell at 3:00 AM to tell him that the only uniforms he could find were black and gold (similar to the Boston Bruins' uniforms of the 1970s), but he did not have enough money to buy them. Grennell agreed to pay for the uniforms using his own credit card. Coincidentally, the Chiefs' first minor league affiliation would be with the Boston Bruins.

The Chiefs along with the Wheeling Thunderbirds (now known as the Wheeling Nailers) played the role of the Pittsburgh Penguins in the 1995 film Sudden Death starring Jean-Claude Van Damme.  The premise was the Penguins playing the Chicago Blackhawks for the Stanley Cup when terrorists attempt to hold the Vice President hostage in the arena.

On August 17, 2007, the Chiefs announced that they entered into an affiliation agreement with the NHL's Colorado Avalanche. During the 2007–08 season, the Chiefs served as the Avalanche's secondary minor league affiliate. On September 18, 2007, the Chiefs announced they had also entered an affiliation agreement with the Boston Bruins for the 2007–08 season.

Prior to the 2008–09 season the Chiefs re-signed their affiliation with the Avalanche and entered into an affiliation agreement with the Columbus Blue Jackets, replacing the Bruins, on August 22, 2008.

For the 2009–10 season, the Chiefs were the secondary minor league affiliate to the Minnesota Wild. Jeff Flanagan took up the role of head coach to start the year. After leading the team to an ECHL cellar dwelling 9–19–7 record, Flanagan was fired, replaced for the remainder of the season by majority owner Neil Smith on January 10, 2010.

In February 2010, the Tribune-Democrat reported that television reports from Greenville, South Carolina, stated that the Chiefs would be relocated to Greenville following the season and compete at the BI-LO Center. Greenville had previously been home to the Greenville Grrrowl, who played in the ECHL from 1998 to 2006 when the ECHL revoked Greenville's franchise rights.  On February 17, 2010, the league announced that the Chiefs would be relocating to Greenville after the league's Board of Governors voted unanimously in favor of the move.  News of the relocation also made the press in New York City, including the New York Times, due to Smith being the former president and governor of the New York Rangers and former general manager of the New York Islanders. The team, renamed the Greenville Road Warriors, then became affiliated with the Rangers.
 
The team played their final game as the Johnstown Chiefs on Saturday April 3, 2010. The result was a 5–3 loss to the Elmira Jackals. According to a pre-game address by minority owner Ned Nakles to the fans in attendance, the Chiefs name, logo, team records and history would not follow the franchise to Greenville, but would remain in Johnstown under ownership by a non-profit group to possibly be used again should a new team enter the ECHL in the city.

The Wheeling Nailers, the ECHL affiliate of the Pittsburgh Penguins, announced prior to the Chiefs season finale that they would play 10 of their 36 regular season home games and one preseason game at the Cambria County War Memorial Arena during the 2010–11 ECHL season.

Season results
Records as of 2009–10 season. 

Note: GP = Games played, W = Wins, L = Losses, T = Ties, OTL = Overtime losses, SOL = Shootout losses, Pts = Points, PCT = Winning percentage, GF = Goals for, GA = Goals against, PIM = Penalties in minutes

Playoffs
1988–89: Defeated Knoxville 4-0 in semifinals; lost to Carolina 4–3 in finals.
1989–90: Did not qualify.
1990–91: Defeated Erie 3–2 in quarterfinals; lost to Hampton Roads 4–1 in semifinals.
1991–92: Defeated Erie 3–1 in first round; lost to Cincinnati 2–0 in quarterfinals.
1992–93: Defeated Richmond 1–0 in first round; lost to Wheeling 3–1 in quarterfinals.
1993–94: Lost to Columbus 2–1 in first round.
1994–95: Lost to South Carolina 3–1 in first round.
1995–96: Did not qualify.
1996–97: Did not qualify.
1997–98: Did not qualify.
1998–99: Did not qualify.
1999–00: Defeated Roanoke 3–1 in first round; lost to Peoria 3–0 in quarterfinals.
2000–01: Lost to Trenton 3–1 in first round.
2001–02: Defeated Peoria 3–2 in first round; lost to Dayton 3–0 in quarterfinals.
2002–03: Did not qualify.
2003–04: Lost to Reading 1–0 in qualifying round.
2004–05: Did not qualify.
2005–06: Defeated Trenton 2–0 in qualifying round; lost to Toledo 3–0 in first round.
2006–07: Lost to Trenton 2–0 in qualifying round.
2007–08: Defeated Dayton 2–0 in qualifying round; lost to Cincinnati 4–0 in first round.
2008–09: Did not qualify.
2009–10: Did not qualify.

Chiefs alumni who have played in the NHL

Retired numbers
The Chiefs retired four numbers: the numbers of Don Hall, Dick Roberge, Galen Head and Reg Kent, all of whom had played for the Johnstown Jets.

 7 – Reg Kent, number retired on February 15, 2009 during a pregame ceremony prior to a game against the Wheeling Nailers.
 8 – Galen Head, number retired by the Chiefs on October 18, 2003 during a pregame ceremony prior to a game against the Long Beach Ice Dogs
 9 – Don Hall, Hall's #9 was originally retired by the Johnstown Jets on April 6, 1962. A separate ceremony involving a banner raising was held by the Johnstown Chiefs during the Chiefs' 1989-90 season.
 11 – Dick Roberge, Roberge's #11 was originally retired by the Johnstown Jets without a ceremony after the completion of the 1971-72 season. A separate ceremony involving a banner raising was held by the Johnstown Chiefs during the Chiefs' 1989-90 season.

League awards

All-Stars
The following players were named to the ECHL All-Star team, announced at the end of the season. 

 1988-89, Scott Gordon, First Team, Goaltender
 1988-89, Rob Hyrtsak, First Team, Center
 1991-92, Mark Green, First Team, Left Wing

Additional Awards
The following players received individual awards from the ECHL, announced at the end of the season.

 1988-89, Scott Gordon, Top Goaltender
 1988-89, Tom Sasso, ECHL Rookie of the Year

References

External links
Johnstown Chiefs Articles & Press Releases

All-American Hockey League teams
Defunct ECHL teams
Minnesota Wild minor league affiliates
Boston Bruins minor league affiliates
Calgary Flames minor league affiliates
Colorado Avalanche minor league affiliates
Columbus Blue Jackets minor league affiliates
Pittsburgh Penguins minor league affiliates
San Jose Sharks minor league affiliates
Tampa Bay Lightning minor league affiliates
Ice hockey clubs established in 1987
Sports clubs disestablished in 2010
Ice hockey teams in Pennsylvania
1987 establishments in Pennsylvania
2010 disestablishments in Pennsylvania
Johnstown, Pennsylvania